"7 Years and 50 Days" is the third single and title track from the album 7 Years and 50 Days by German trance group Groove Coverage. A video was released for this song in which a girl catches her boyfriend cheating on her which results into gluttony and ends with her eating the whole furniture of her flat while she is watching Melanie Munch on TV performing the song.

Remix List

"7 Years & 50 Days" (Radio Mix) – 3:44
"7 Years & 50 Days" (Album Version) – 3:19
"7 Years & 50 Days" (Radio Edit) – 3:47
"7 Years & 50 Days" (Extended Version) – 6:11
"7 Years & 50 Days" (Plazmatek VS. Cascada Remix) – 5:57
"7 Years & 50 Days" (Plazmatek VS. Cascada Remix Short Cut) – 3:37
"7 Years & 50 Days" (Delaction Remix) - 5:40

Chart positions

References

Groove Coverage songs
2004 songs
2004 singles
Songs written by Lou Bega